The Fassa Valley (Ladin: Fascia) is a valley in the Dolomites in Trentino, northern Italy. As an administrative valley community (Italian: Comunità di valle, German: Talgemeinschaft) of Trentino, it is called Region Comun General de Fascia. 

The valley is the home of the Ladin community in Trentino, which make up the majority of the population.

Municipalities 
The municipalities in the valley include (Ladin name):

Canazei (Cianacei)
Campitello di Fassa (Ciampedel)
Mazzin (Mazin)
San Giovanni di Fassa (Sen Jan)
Soraga di Fassa (Soraga)
Moena (Moena)

External links 

Ladinia
Valleys of Trentino